Tatyana Heard (born 14 January 1995) is an English rugby union player. She is a member of the England women's national rugby union team and plays for Gloucester-Hartpury in the Premier 15s.

International career
Heard had initially been selected for the England U20 squad in 2012-13 but shortly afterwards an ACL injury left her sidelined for well over a year. She eventually made her senior England debut in November 2018 against the USA.

In September 2022 Heard was named in the England squad for the COVID-delayed 2021 Rugby World Cup.

Club career 
After university Heard moved to Gloucester and from 2017 has played for Gloucester-Hartpury in a variety of positions.

Early life and education 
Heard was born in Italy and spent some of her early years in the US, but she grew up in Ryedale where she played for Malton and Norton RUFC and for Yorkshire at age grade level. She studied for A-levels at Hartpury College and then for a degree in sports conditioning, rehabilitation and massage at Cardiff Metropolitan University, where she was part of the Cardiff Met team that won the 2016 BUCS rugby final.

References 

Living people
1995 births
England women's international rugby union players
English female rugby union players
21st-century English women